The 1995 season was the Minnesota Vikings' 35th in the National Football League (NFL). Under head coach Dennis Green, they finished with an 8–8 record and still had a chance to make the playoffs entering Week 17 against the Cincinnati Bengals; however, victories by the Chicago Bears and the Atlanta Falcons in their final games rendered the Vikings' defeat to the Bengals inconsequential, and Minnesota missed the playoffs for the first time since the 1991 season. Despite the team's poor play, rookie safety Orlando Thomas recorded a league-leading 9 interceptions of the season.

Offseason

1995 Expansion Draft

1995 Draft

 The Vikings traded a 1994 second-round selection (45th overall) and DE Chris Doleman to the Atlanta Falcons in exchange for the Falcons' 1994 second-round selection (40th overall) and a 1995 first-round selection (11th overall) on April 24, 1994.
 The Vikings traded OT Gary Zimmerman to the Denver Broncos in exchange for the Broncos' 1994 first-round selection (18th overall), 1994 sixth-round selection (179th overall) and 1995 second-round selection (42nd overall) on August 23, 1993.
 The Vikings traded QB Warren Moon to the Houston Oilers in exchange for the Oilers' third-round selection (89th overall) and 1994 fourth-round selection (119th overall).
 The Vikings traded a fourth-round selection (121st overall) and a sixth-round selection (196th overall) to the Denver Broncos in exchange for the Broncos' fourth-round selection (111th overall).
 The Vikings traded a 1996 sixth-round selection (182nd overall) and S Vencie Glenn to the New York Giants in exchange for the Giants' sixth-round selection (189th overall) and a 1996 fifth-round selection (137th overall).

Preseason

Regular season

Schedule

Note: Intra-division opponents are in bold text.

Standings

Statistics

Team leaders

League rankings

Staff

Roster

Awards and records
 Cris Carter, led NFL in receiving touchdowns
 Cris Carter, All-Pro selection
 Cris Carter, Pro Bowl selection
 Orlando Thomas, NFL interceptions leader (9)

Milestones
 Cris Carter, 100 reception season 
 Warren Moon, 4th 4,000-yard passing season

References

External links
 1995 Minnesota Vikings Statistics & Players on Pro-Football-Reference.com

Minnesota Vikings seasons
Minnesota
Minnesota